Michal Lesák (born 18 August 1975 in Kutná Hora) is a Czech former footballer who played as a defender.

External links

1975 births
Living people
Czech footballers
Czech First League players
FC Hradec Králové players
Bohemians 1905 players
1. FK Příbram players
FC Baník Ostrava players
Association football defenders
AS Trenčín players
People from Kutná Hora
Sportspeople from the Central Bohemian Region